The 2017–18 South West Peninsula League season is the eleventh in the history of the South West Peninsula League, a football competition in England, that feeds the Premier Division of the Western Football League. The league had been formed in 2007 from the merger of the Devon County League and the South Western League, and is restricted to clubs based in Cornwall and Devon. The Premier Division of the South West Peninsula League is on the same level of the National League System as the Western League Division One.

The constitution was announced on 26 May 2017.

Premier Division

The Premier Division features 20 teams, the same as the previous season, after St Blazey were relegated to Division One East, and Tiverton Town Reserves left the league.

Three new clubs joined the league:
Sticker, promoted from Division One West.
Stoke Gabriel, promoted from Division One East.
Reserve sides are not eligible for promotion to Step 5.

Any Step 6 club without ground grading Grade G were to be relegated to Step 7. Godolphin Atlantic and Stoke Gabriel passed the ground grading requirements with a dispensation that certain works had to be completed by 30 September 2018, or those clubs will face a financial penalty. Potential demotion at the end of next season would result if they were not compliant by 31 March 2019. Stoke Gabriel subsequently sought voluntary demotion because they announced that their groundworks would not be ready by the deadline. All step 6 leagues were to be fixed at a maximum of 20 clubs for 2018–19.

Only Plymouth Parkway applied for promotion to Step 5.

League table

Division One East
Division One East features 18 clubs, the same as the previous season, after Stoke Gabriel were promoted to the Premier Division and Exwick Villa were relegated:

Honiton Town, promoted from the Devon & Exeter League.
Ilfracombe Town, promoted from the North Devon League.

Galmpton United changed their name to Galmpton & Roselands.
Totnes & Dartington resigned from the league before the season started, but were not replaced.

Crediton United, Ilfracombe Town and Newton Abbot Spurs applied for promotion to the Premier Division. All three passed the ground grading, but Newton Abbot later withdrew their application.

Division One West
Division One West features 18 clubs, the same as the previous season, after Sticker were promoted to the Premier Division, Vospers Oak Villa were relegated, and two new clubs joined:

Ludgvan, promoted from the Cornwall Combination.
St Blazey, relegated from the Premier Division.

Penryn Athletic resigned from the league before the season started, but were not replaced.

Elburton Villa, Liskeard Athletic, Millbrook, Mousehole, Porthleven, St Blazey, St Dennis, Wadebridge Town and Wendron United have applied for promotion to the Premier Division. St Blazey failed the ground grading; Millbrook, Mousehole, St Dennis and Wendron passed with dispensation, and the others passed.

Promotion from feeder leagues for 2018–19
Several clubs have applied for promotion to the SWPL for the 2018–19 season. Their success will depend on finishing in the top three in their respective leagues and other factors including ground facilities. Clubs finishing in the top two in their leagues have the automatic right to promotion if they pass the ground grading. Clubs finishing third in their leagues, and any clubs applying from outside the football pyramid, do not have an automatic right to promotion. Only one club per league can be accepted. If two or more clubs satisfy all requirements and are considered of equal merit, the league board will decide on which club(s) to accept. If all five feeder leagues provide a club eligible for promotion, then the two clubs finishing in 17th positions in Division One East / West will be relegated.

The following clubs have applied for promotion to Division One East and West for next season. Their ground grading results are also included below:
Cornwall Combination – Carharrack (failed)
Devon & Exeter Football League (all passed) – Cronies (rejected), Elmore (accepted), Exwick Villa (rejected), Newtown (rejected)
East Cornwall League – Bere Alston United (passed, accepted)
North Devon Football League – Braunton (passed, rejected)
South Devon Football League – Kingsteignton Athletic (passed, rejected), Waldon Athletic (passed, accepted)
Application from outside the football pyramid structure – Torquay United Reserves (passed, withdrawn)

References

External links
 South West Peninsula League

South West Peninsula League
10